Jai Bihari Lal Khachi or J.B.L Khachi (5 May 1927 – 10 April 2002) was an Indian politician from Kumarsain in Shimla District of Himachal Pradesh, India. He was a former cabinet minister of Himachal Pradesh and a member of the Indian National Congress.

Early life 
J.B.L Khachi was born on 5 May 1927 at Ghumana village of Kumharsain tehsil in Shimla district of Himachal Pradesh. His father, Hira Nand Khachi, was a man of progressive views and was very disciplined. Khachi became a Law graduate from Lahore. He then pursued his further studies from the University of Delhi.

Political career 
After his studies, he returned to Himachal Pradesh and joined the co-operative movement in the state. He contested his first two elections of Himachal Pradesh Legislative Assembly in 1967 and 1972 as Independent candidate and in both he won. In 1977 he joined Indian National Congress. He was elected 6 times as MLA, one time from Theog constituency in 1967 and 5 times from Kumarsain constituency in 1972, 1982, 1985, 1993 and 1998. He also remained 3 times minister in Virbhadra Singh's cabinet.
 

J.B.L Khachi and Thakur Sen Negi founded Himachal Pradesh Lok Raj Party (LRP) in 1967. LRP contested the 1971 Lok Sabha elections and the 1972 state assembly elections.

In the 1972 state assembly elections LRP had put up candidates in 16 out of 68 constituencies. Two were elected as MLA from Kinnaur and Arki constituency. The party was dissolved just before the 1977 state assembly elections.

Apart from being at various times MLA and cabinet minister, he was also the Chairman of Working group (1967–1970), General Secretary of the Progressive front in Himachal Pradesh Vidhan Sabha (1970–1973), President of the Himachal Pradesh State Cooperative Union (1962–1974) and General Secretary of the Himachal Pradesh Congress Committee (1990–1993). He had also given speech in the annual meeting of the World Economic Forum held in Davos, Switzerland.

Death 
Khachi died of a heart attack on the morning of 10 April 2002. At that time Khachi was the sitting MLA of Kumarsain constituency.

See also 
 Kumarsain
 Kumarsain Assembly constituency
 Theog Assembly constituency

References 

1927 births
2002 deaths
People from Shimla
Members of the Himachal Pradesh Legislative Assembly
20th-century Indian politicians
Indian National Congress politicians from Himachal Pradesh
Himachal Pradesh MLAs 1998–2003
Himachal Pradesh MLAs 1993–1998
Himachal Pradesh MLAs 1985–1990
Himachal Pradesh MLAs 1982–1985
Himachal Pradesh MLAs 1972–1977
Himachal Pradesh MLAs 1967–1972 
Indian National Congress politicians
People from Shimla district
St. Stephen's College, Delhi alumni